Asfaltomylos is an extinct genus of the primitive mammal subclass Australosphenida from the Jurassic of Argentina. The type and only species is Asfaltomylos patagonicus, recovered from and named after the Cañadón Asfalto Formation, Cañadón Asfalto Basin of Chubut Province, Patagonia.

See also 
 Argentoconodon
 Condorodon
 Henosferus

References

Further reading 
 G. W. Rougier, A. G. Martinelli, A. M. Forasiepi and M. J. Novacek. 2007. "New Jurassic Mammals from Patagonia, Argentina: A Reappraisal of Australosphenidan Morphology and Interrelationships". American Museum Novitates (3566) 1-54
 Martin, T. & Rauhut, O. W. M. 2005. "Mandible and dentition of Asfaltomylos patagonicus (Australosphenida, Mammalia) and the evolution of tribosphenic teeth". Journal of Vertebrate Paleontology 25 (2): 414–425.
 Rauhut, O. W. M., Martin, T., Ortiz-Jaureguizar, E. & Puerta, P. 2002. "A Jurassic mammal from South America". Nature 416: 165–168.

Australosphenida
Jurassic mammals of South America
Jurassic Argentina
Fossils of Argentina
 
 
Fossil taxa described in 2002
Prehistoric mammal genera